Brigitte is a feminine given name. Notable people with the name include:

 Brigitte Amm, German rower
 Brigitte Bardot (born 1934), a French actress and singer
 Brigitte Becue (born 1972), a Belgian breaststroke swimmer
 Brigitte Bierlein (born 1949), an Austrian jurist and politician
 Brigitte Engerer (born 1952), a French pianist
 Brigitte Fossey (born 1946), a French actress
 Brigitte Foster-Hylton (born 1974), a Jamaican hurdling athlete
 Brigitte Gabriel, an activist and founder of hate group ACT
 Brigitte Girardin (born 1953), French diplomat and politician
 Brigitte Haentjens, French-born Canadian theatre director
 Brigitte Hamann (1940–2016), German-Austrian historian
 Brigitte Lahaie (born 1955), a French porn actress
 Brigitte Lin (born 1954), a Taiwanese actress
 Brigitte Macron (born 1953), Emmanuel Macron's wife
 Brigitte Mira (born 1910), a German actress
 Brigitte Mohnhaupt (born 1949), a German Red Army Faction member
 Brigitte Nielsen (born 1963), a Danish actress
 Brigitte Poupart, Canadian actress and filmmaker
 Brigitte Rintisch, German rower
 Brigitte Sauriol (born 1945), Canadian film director and screenwriter
 Brigitte Soucy (born 1972), a Canadian volleyball player
 Brigitte Steden (1949–1999), Former West German badminton player
 Brigitte Affidehome Tonon , Beninois researcher, author, basketball coach and former player

Fictional people 
 Brigitte (Overwatch), character in the 2016 video game
Brigitte Fitzgerald, character in the Ginger Snaps film trilogy

References

See also
 Birgitte, Duchess of Gloucester, wife of Prince Richard, Duke of Gloucester
 Gitta (disambiguation)